Habib Digbo G'nampa Maïga (born 1 January 1996) is an Ivorian professional footballer who plays as a midfielder for French  club FC Metz and Ivory Coast national football team.

Club career

Saint-Étienne
Having come through the second team ranks, Maïga made his debut for the Ligue 1 side on 4 March 2017 against Bastia. He played the whole match in a 0–0 away draw. He scored his first goal for 'Les verts' on 14 October 2017 when he came on as a late substitute against FC Metz and sealed a 3–1 win in the 95th minute.

Loan to Arsenal Tula
On 21 February 2018, he joined Russian club FC Arsenal Tula on loan until the end of the 2017–18 season.

Metz
On 10 June 2018, Maïga returned to France joining Ligue 2 club FC Metz for a one-year loan with an obligation to buy. During the 2018–19 season, Maïga and Metz won the French Ligue 2 and were promoted to Ligue 1.

In June 2019 it was confirmed, that Metz had activated the option to buy the player on permanent basis for €1 million.

International career
Maïga was called up to the senior Ivory Coast squad for a World Cup qualifier against Morocco in November 2017.

He made his debut on 6 September 2019 in a friendly against Benin, as a starter.

Career statistics

Club

References

External links

1996 births
Living people
People from Gagnoa
Association football midfielders
Ivorian footballers
Ivorian expatriate footballers
Expatriate footballers in France
Expatriate footballers in Russia
AS Saint-Étienne players
FC Arsenal Tula players
FC Metz players
Ligue 1 players
Russian Premier League players
Ivorian expatriate sportspeople in France
Ivory Coast international footballers
Ligue 2 players
2021 Africa Cup of Nations players